Angela Yuen Wu is an American computer scientist, a professor emerita at American University. She is known for her research in computer vision and computational geometry, and especially for her highly cited publications on k-means clustering and nearest neighbor search.
Other topics in her research include embeddings of tree-structured parallel systems into the hypercube internetwork topology and voxel-based object representations.

Education
Wu did her undergraduate studies at Villanova University, majoring in mathematics, and earned a master's degree in mathematics from Cornell University. She completed her studies with a doctorate in computer science from the University of Maryland, College Park in 1978. Her dissertation, Cellular Graph Automata, was supervised by Azriel Rosenfeld.

Professional service
Wu was the founder of the annual Vision Geometry Conference, and for many years served as the chair of the conference. She became president of Upsilon Pi Epsilon for the 2002–2003 term, and again for 2008–2009.

Selected publications

References

Year of birth missing (living people)
Living people
American computer scientists
American women computer scientists
Researchers in geometric algorithms
Villanova University alumni
Cornell University alumni
University of Maryland, College Park alumni
21st-century American women